Kirill Yakovlevich Kondratyev (14 June 1920 – 1 May 2006) was a Soviet and Russian atmospheric physicist.

Career 
Kondratyev was born in Rybinsk. He went to school in Leningrad and in 1938 entered the University of Leningrad to study physics, mathematics, and chemistry. In 1941, he joined the Russian army and fought in the siege of Leningrad. He graduated in atmospheric physics in 1946 and was made an assistant professor in the Faculty of Physics. 

He later held the posts of lecturer, research scientist, professor of atmospheric physics, chief of the Department of Atmospheric Physics, University Vice-Rector and Rector. From 1958-61 he was Head of the Department of Radiation Studies at the Main Geophysical Observatory. He was a staff member of the Institute for Lake Research and the Research Centre for Ecological Safety. He helped to create the Nansen International Environmental and Remote Sensing Centre.

Acknowledgements 
He was a member of the Academy of Sciences of the Soviet Union and Russian Academy of Sciences, the International Academy of Astronautics, the German National Academy of Sciences Leopoldina (1970), the American Meteorological Society and the Royal Meteorological Society. He received Honorary Doctorates from the Universities of Lille (France), Athens (Greece) and Budapest (Hungary). His prizes include the USSR State Prize and the twelfth International Meteorological Organization Prize. He was editorial advisor to Proceedings of the Russian Geographic Society (Russia), Idojaras (Hungary), Meteorology and Atmospheric Physics (Austria), Atmosfera (Mexico), Il Nuovo Cimento C (Italy) and Sustainable Development (USA).

Research 
During 1970-75, he was a leading researcher in the Complex Atmospheric Energetic Experiment (CAENEX) project, the object of which was to study the transport of all categories of energy and all types of flux heat divergence in the atmosphere. Along with determining the shortwave(IR) absorption of atmospheric aerosols.

Kondratyev served as a member of the International Programme Committee for the World Conference on Climate Change, held in Moscow in 2003, where he presented a paper entitled "Uncertainties of Global Climate Change Observations and Simulation Modeling." He expressed skepticism about global warming.

References

Further reading

1920 births
2006 deaths
20th-century Russian physicists
21st-century Russian physicists
People from Rybinsk
Fellows of the American Academy of Arts and Sciences
Full Members of the Russian Academy of Sciences
Full Members of the USSR Academy of Sciences
Members of the German Academy of Sciences Leopoldina
Rectors of Saint Petersburg State University
Recipients of the Order of Honour (Russia)
Recipients of the Order of Lenin
Recipients of the Order of the Red Banner of Labour
Recipients of the USSR State Prize
Atmospheric physicists
Russian meteorologists
Russian physicists
Soviet meteorologists
Soviet physicists